The tribes of Jharkhand consist of 32 scheduled tribes  inhabiting the Jharkhand state in India. In 1872, only 18 tribes were counted among the schedule tribes from which Banjara, Bhatudi, Chik Baraik and Mahli were marked as semi-Hindu aboriginal and Kora as proletariat Hindu. In the 1931 census, including above four semi-Hindu aboriginal and Kora, a proletariat Hindu, the number was raised to 26 from 18 by adding four more in the annexure. They were Birajia, Godait, Karmali and Paharia, but Kisan was excluded from the list. In 1941 census, Baga, Bedia and Lohra included again taking Kisan in the annexure and number came to 30 which was prevailing till June 2003.
Kanwar  and Kol were added on 8 June 2003 in the annexure and the number of Schedule Tribes came to 32.

Classification
The tribes in Jharkhand were originally classified on the basis of their cultural types by the Indian anthropologist, Lalita Prasad Vidyarthi. His classification was as follows:

 Hunter-gatherer type — Birhor, Korwa, Hill Kharia
 Shifting agriculture — Sauria Paharia, Mal Paharia
 Simple artisans — Mahli, Lohra, Karmali, Chik Baraik
 Settled agriculturists — Bhumij, Ho, Oraon, Munda, Santhal etc.

Demography
The Scheduled Tribe (ST) population of Jharkhand State is per the 2011 census 8,645,042 (others including Sarna-4,012,622 Christian-1,338,175) of the total population (32,988,134) of the State. Among all States and UTs, Jharkhand holds 6th and 10th ranks terms of the ST population and the percentage share of the ST population to the total population of the State respectively. The growth of the ST population has been 17.3 percent, which is lower by 6 percentage points if compared with the growth of the State's total population (23.3 percent) during 1991–2001. The state has thirty Scheduled Tribes and all of them have been enumerated at 2001 census. The Scheduled Tribes are primarily rural as 91.7 percent of them reside in villages. District-wise distribution of ST population shows that Gumla district has the highest proportion of STs (68.94 percent). The STs constitute more than half of the total population in Lohardaga (56.89 percent) and Pashchimi Singhbhum (67.31 percent) districts whereas Ranchi has 35.76 percent and Pakur district has 42.1 percent tribal population. Koderma district (0.96 percent) preceded by Chatra (4.37 percent) has the lowest proportion of the STs Population.

List of tribes 

 Asur
 Baiga
 Banjara
 Bathudi
 Bedia
 Bhumij
 Binjhia
 Birhor
 Birjia
 Chero
 Chik Baraik
 Gond
 Gorait
 Ho
 Kanwar
 Karmali
 Kharia
 Kharwar
 Khond
 Kisan
 Kora
 Kol
 Korwa
 Lohra
 Mahli
 Mal Pahariya
 Munda
 Oraon
 Parhaiya
 Santhal
 Sauria Paharia
 Savar

Literacy and educational level
The overall literacy rate among the STs has increased from 27.5 percent at 1991 census to 40.7 percent at 2001 census. Despite this improvement, the literacy rate among the tribes is much below in comparison to that of all STs at the national level (47.1 percent).
Among the numerically larger tribes, Oraon and Kharia have more than half of the population in the age of seven years and above are literates while Munda have the literacy rate almost equal to that of all STs at the national level.
Among the total tribal literates, 33.6 percent are either without any educational level or have attained education below primary level. The proportions of literates who have attained education up to primary level and middle level are 28.6 percent and 17.7 percent respectively. Persons educated up to matric / secondary / higher secondary constitute 16.5 percent. This implies that every 6th tribal literate is matriculate. Graduates and above are 3.5 percent while non-technical and technical diploma holders constitute a negligible 0.1 percent.
Out of the total 19.8 lakh tribal children in the age group 5–14 years, only 8.5 lakh children have been attending school constituting 43.1 percent. As many as 11.3 lakh (56.9 percent) children in the corresponding age group have not been going to school. The statement below shows that among the major STs, Munda, Oraon and Kharia have more than 50 percent school going children whereas Santhal, Ho, Lohra have 36–47 percent children attending school.

Tribal festivals in Jharkhand

Sarhul

Sarhul is a spring festival celebrated when the Saal trees get new flowers on their branches. It is a worship of the village deity who is considered to be the protector of the tribes. People sing and dance when the new flowers appear. The deities are worshiped with saal flowers. The village priest or Pahan fasts for a couple of days. In the early morning he takes a bath and puts on new a dhoti made of virgin cotton (kachha dhaga). The previous evening, the Pahan takes three new earthen pots and fills them with fresh water; the next morning he observes these earthen pots and water level inside. If the water level decreases he predicts that there would be famine or less rain, and if the water level is normal, that is the signal of a good rain. Before pooja starts, the wife of the Pahan washes his feet and gets blessings from him. At the pooja, Pahan offers three young roosters of different colors to one for the god — the Singbonga or Dharmesh, as the Bhumijs, Mundas, Hos and Oraons respectively address him; another for the village deities; and the third for the ancestors. During this pooja villagers surround the Sarna place. 
Traditional drum — Dhol, Nagara and Turhi — players keep drumming and playing along with Pahan chanting prayers to deities. When pooja is finished, boys carry Pahan on their shoulders and girls dancing ahead take him to his house where his wife welcomes him by washing his feet. Then Pahan offers Saal flowers to his wife and villagers. These flowers represent the brotherhood and friendship among villagers and Pahan the priest, distributes saal flowers to every villager. He also puts saals flowers on every house's roof which is called "phool khonsi". At the same time Prasad, a rice made beer called Handia, is distributed among the villagers. And the whole village celebrates with singing and dancing this festival of Sarhul. It goes on for weeks in this region of Chhotanagpur. In Kolhan region it is called "Baa Porob" meaning Flower Festival.

Baha Parab
Baha parab is spring festival of Ho, Munda and Santal people. Baha means flower in Munda languages.
People worship Marang buru in jaherthan or sacred grove.

Mage Porob
Mage Porob is the principal festival celebrated among the Ho people of eastern India, and is also celebrated by the Munda people, though followers of Birsa Dharam, a new religion based on traditional Munda spirituality and religion, do not celebrate Mage Porob, despite the fact that they celebrate other traditional Munda festivals. It is also not celebrated by any other Munda-speaking peoples, and is much less prominent to the Mundas than to the Hos. It is held in the month of Magha in honor of the deity Singbonga who, in the Ho creation myth, created Luku Kola, the first man on Earth. It was first described in 1912 by Indian anthropologist Rai Bahadur Sarat Chandra Roy in his The Mundas and their Country.

Hal Punhya
Hal Punhya is a festival which begins with the fall of winter. The first day of Magha month, known as "Akhain Jatra" or "Hal Punhya", considered as the beginning of ploughing season. The farmers, to symbolize this auspicious morning plough two and half circles of their agricultural land. This day is also considered as the symbol of good fortune.

Sendra festival 
Sendra festival, locally known as Disum Sendra is an annual hunting festival celebrated on the top of Dalma hills by the tribal people of Chotanagpur region. It is celebrated on the full moon day in the month of Baisakh (usually from April to May) to rejuvenate both the youth of the tribal communities and the wild animals of the forest. On this occasion, hunting games are organized in the dark. The festival is commonly celebrated by the Santal, Bhumij, Munda, Ho, Birhor and Kharia peoples.

Tribal artwork
Tribal woodwork - Jharkhand is full of good quality saal forest and hence wooden artwork in the "should" of tribals. The wood is used for cooking, housing, farming, fishing etc. The tribal artists of some villages have explored their creativity in art, like beautifully decorative door panels, toys, boxes, and other household articles.
Tribal Painting - The painting is mainly a source of livelihood for the Hyhyh tribe in Jharkhand and practiced in the region of Santhal Pragana and nearby areas.
Tribal Bamboo Artwork - The bamboo found in this area are different from bamboo of Southeast Asia. There is tourist place, Netarhat, which means a Bazaar of Bamboo. These bamboos are thin, strong and flexible. The tribal people use bamboo for making baskets, hunting & fishing equipment such as fishing cages.
Godna - Tribals use ornaments a lots but the spiritual concept of ornament is very different. They believe that all ornaments are human made and are mortal. Therefore, they invented tattoos as permanent ornament. Majority of tribal woman have tattoos called Godna, on their bodies. However, tribal man also use Godna. They believe that Godna are the only ornament which goes with them after death also.

Tribal religion

Sarna

Although Hinduism is the predominant religion of the State (68.6 percent), the Hindu tribes constitute 39.8 percent only. As many as 45.1 percent of the tribal population follow 'other religions and persuasions'. Christian tribes are 14.5 percent and less than half percent (0.4 percent) are Muslims. Among the major tribes, more than half of the total population (56.6 percent) of nature worshiping Santals are 'Bedins' who also worship bongas. Oraon and Munda have more than 50 percent of population follow 'other religions and persuasions' followed by Christianity. Ho tribe has the highest proportion (91 percent) of persons professing 'other religions and persuasions'.

Sarna religion/Sarna Dharam (regarded by tribals as Sari Dharam, that means True Religion) is religion of tribals of India. They have their own worship place called "SARNA ASTHAL/JAHER". They have also religious flag called "SARNA JHANDA". Which can be seen more in Ranchi District. In Ranchi the capital of Jharkhand, there are  "SARNA ASTHAL". In SARHUL festival every Oraon gather in Ranchi with a great rally. In this time "SARNA JHANDA" can be seen every where in Ranchi.

Some tribes followed Sarna Dharam, where Sarna means sacred grove. Their religion is based on oral traditions passed from generation-to-generation. The religion is deeply ingrained in their culture and traditions, respecting the superiority of the natural world and its power. Sarna Dharam believes in one God, the Supreme Being who rules over the entire universe, known as Dharmesh. They believe in Lord Dharmesh's appearance in Sal trees.

According to their philosophy, the lord Dharmesh is the most powerful and most important deity. He is responsible for the creation of our universe including their ancestors, and acts as their protector. In fact, the whole world (Universe) is regulated by a superpower that is Dharmesh in Kurukh which simply means the almighty, he is also called Mahaedeo. The great one Dharmesh's purity demands that he be offered sacrifices only of things that are white. Hence he is given sacrifices of white goats, white fowls, white gulainchi flowers, white cloth, sugar, milk, etc. White is the sacred colour of Oraon tribe, in fact it is true for most adivasi.

Among the many important deities, the Chala-pacho Devi (Sarna Devi) is among the most important and most respected deity. The Gram Devi Chala-Pachho is a caring old lady with beautifully flowing white hair. It is believed that the Sal tree is the holy abode of the Sarna Devi, the mother goddess that protects and nurtures the Oraon tribe and others. On the occasion of Sarhul festival, the Pahan conducts special puja of the Devi. According to Sarna Dharam, the Devi lives in the wooden soop of Pahan kept at Chala-Kutti place, the auspicious place at Pahan's home. At Kutti place, one stick made up of Saal wood or Bamboo Wood is fixed on the ground, on this respected wooden soop called Sarna-Soop, the Sarna-Devi resides.

Tribals perform rituals under the Sal trees at a place called 'Sarna Sthal', it is also known a 'Jaher' (sacred grove); it resembles a small forest patch. In Oraons' villages, one can easily find the sacred religious place the 'Sarna Sthal' that has holy Sal trees and other trees planted at the site. Sometimes the Jaher are located inside the nearby forest area and not in the village.

This Sarna Sthal (Jaher) is a common religious place for the whole village and almost all the important socio-religious ceremonies of the village take place at this place only. These ceremonies are performed by the whole village community at a public gathering with the active participation of village priests known as ‘Pahan’. The chief assistant of village priest is called ‘Pujaar’ or ‘Panbhara’.

The tribals have their own way of conscience, faith and belief. They believe in the supernatural spirit called the Singbonga. According to the belief of the Santhal community, the world is inhabited by spiritual beings of different kinds; and the Santhals consider themselves as living and doing everything in close association with these supernatural beings. They perform rituals under the Sal trees at a place called "Jaher" (sacred grove). Often the Jaher can be found in the forests. They believe in Bonga's appearance in Sal trees and have named their religion "Sarna." There are priests and an assistant priests called "Naikey" and "Kudam Naike" in every Santhal village.

According to the mythology of the Santhal community, the Sarna religion began when the Santhal tribals had gone to the forest for hunting and they started the discussion about their ‘Creator and Savior’ while they were resting under a tree. They questioned themselves that who is their God, the Sun, the Wind or the Cloud? Finally, they came to a conclusion that they would shoot an arrow in the sky and wherever the arrow would target that will be the God's house. The arrow fell down under a Sal tree. They started worshiping the tree and named their religion "Sarna" because it is derived from a Sal tree. Thus, the Sarna religion came into existence.

Sarna Union
All India Sarna Dhorom, at Jhoradi in the Mayurbhanj district, Odisha. It was from this union that as many procession, demonstration with their drums and equipment like TUMDH, TAMAK, GHURI, CHORCHURI, AAH, SAR, KHANDA, TARWALE etc. held in the various part of the country like Odisha, Jharkhand, West Bengal, Madhya Pradesh and in many other places. Their aims and objective was to raise the audible voice in ears of State and Central Government so that they are being protected from extinct and their laws and religious are being valued by Government and people of India as other religious. It has its Law and order made by its cabinet committee and it is being followed by all Sarnaism. They too organize seminars, conferences to enhance their laws and order among all Sarnaism. There are many charitable trust to provide free medical treatment among the poor people, they too, run many schools and colleges in the mentioned state of India.

See also 
 Tribal revolts in India before Indian independence

References

External links

 
Scheduled Tribes of India